Koray Kırcı (born 17 August 1998) is a Turkish tennis player.

Kırcı has a career high ATP singles ranking of 868 achieved on 30 July 2018. He also has a career high ATP doubles ranking of 855 achieved on 29 October 2018.

Kırcı made his ATP main draw debut at the 2018 Antalya Open in the doubles draw partnering Ergi Kırkın.

External links
 
 

1998 births
Living people
Turkish male tennis players
20th-century Turkish people
21st-century Turkish people